Robinsons Galleria, also known as Robinsons Galleria Ortigas, is a mixed-use complex and shopping mall located at EDSA corner Ortigas Avenue, Quezon City, just near SM Megamall. The mall is owned by Robinsons Malls, and it is their flagship mall. It is the 1st Robinsons Mall to bear the Galleria branding.

The mall
Robinsons Galleria is a 5-level shopping mall and a landmark along EDSA and Ortigas Avenue with more than 400 shops, dining outlets, entertainment facilities, and service centers. It is located within a mixed-use complex composed of two high-rise office towers, the Galleria Corporate Center and Robinsons Equitable Tower. Three hotels are also located among the said towers, the Holiday Inn Manila Galleria and Crowne Plaza Manila Galleria, and the Galleria Regency.

A major tenant of the mall is the central passport office of the Department of Foreign Affairs in Metro Manila called DFA Consular Office NCR-Central, which is located on the first floor of the Lingkod Pinoy Center, and which was inaugurated in September 2012.

History 
The mall's location was once an open land owned by the SSS in the Ortigas Central Business District. In February 1986, the portion of the land facing EDSA was where participants in the People Power Revolution also protested; tanks going north to Camp Aguinaldo and Camp Crame were stopped at this spot. In 1987, John Gokongwei bought the large portion of the land from the SSS, while the Archdiocese of Manila had partly purchased the portion of the land near the intersection. This plot today is the site of EDSA Shrine, which belongs to the Archdiocese up to date.

Construction began in mid-1988 and finished in late 1989. The mall opened in 1990, being the first mall of Robinsons Malls. Since its opening, several renovations had made within the mall, expanding its area to 216,000 square meters.

Incidents

March 2012 robbery
On March 29, 2012, one guard was killed and six others wounded after two armed robbers lobbed a couple of grenades while fleeing with their loot. The Philippine National Police spokesman Chief Superintendent Agrimero Cruz Jr. said that by 10:15 AM, two unidentified suspects in disguise as guards attacked two bank guards who were escorting bank tellers and were supposed to deliver an undetermined amount of money in a money changer shop at the mall's ground floor.

October 2013 fire
On October 29, 2013, a fire broke out inside the department store's toy section. The fire started at around 11:00 PM when the employees who were decorating Christmas lights inside the mall rushed out the mall to flee the premises. Guests from the Holiday Inn evacuated and moved to the adjacent Crowne Plaza Hotel. The fire raged for about six hours. The fire was under control the next morning, and the mall was closed for two days. The mall soon reopened by noon on November 1, 2013.

Redevelopment
The mall had gone for several renovations since it opened in 1990. In 2012, the mall took its major facelift with additional GLA of around 100,000 square meters that can cater at least 50 tenants. The said developments expanded the mall's GLA to what is now 216,000 square meters.

The latest redevelopment had started in 2016. It will be done in 2 phases with its first phase of renovation from May to October 2016 while the second phase was to start in May 2017. Aside from the major renovations within the mall, the mall veranda will host more service stores related to health and beauty. There will be an upper veranda at the 3rd floor, formerly occupying the sports loop, which will accommodate more dining choices. The mall's renovation is almost complete.

The mall's renovation will add wooden elements into the mall, a design similar to Robinsons Galleria Cebu.

In popular culture
An urban legend relating to the mall flourished in the 1990s, which claimed of a half-snake, half-human creature that resided in the basement of the mall and purported to be a lucky charm installed by the Gokongwei family, feeding it with unsuspecting victims from a supposed shaft from a dressing room. Among its supposed victims were actresses Alice Dixson and Rita Avila. Although the rumor is now considered absurd and dead, it was revived in 2010 after a supposed YouTube video depicting it surfaced. Businesswoman Robina Gokongwei-Pe asserted in 2008 that the tale emerged from the "market competition". Dixson herself dismissed the entire narrative as fake, and in 2020 she finally put the entire tale to rest through a YouTube video.  She had appeared in a videographic advertisement by Robinsons Galleria two years earlier, poking fun of and lampooning the extinct urban legend.

References

Shopping malls established in 1990
1990 establishments in the Philippines
Buildings and structures in Quezon City
Shopping malls in Quezon City
Tourist attractions in Quezon City
Ortigas Center
Robinsons Malls
Conspiracy theories in the Philippines
Urban legends